Harrafteh or Harofteh or Horafteh, also rendered as Harowfteh, may refer to:

Harrafteh, Lorestan
Harofteh, Yazd